A hose is a flexible hollow tube designed to carry fluids from one location to another.

Hose may also refer to:

Places
 Hose, Leicestershire, England
 Hose Mountains, a mountain range in central Sarawak, Malaysia

Other uses
 Hose (surname)
 The Ho Chi Minh Stock Exchange 
 HOSE, a term used for playing a mixed game of poker consisting of four different poker games
 Hose (band), "artcore" band from the 1980s
 Hose (album), an album by Hose
 Hose (clothing)
 Boothose
 Pantyhose

See also
 
 
 Ho (disambiguation)
 Hoser (disambiguation)
 Rubber hose (disambiguation)